Areia Branca no Dolok Oan is a  Important Bird Area (IBA) in East Timor, a country occupying the eastern end of the island of Timor at the eastern end of the Lesser Sunda Islands group of Wallacea.

Description
The IBA lies just east of the capital, Dili, on the north coast of the island. It encompasses a marine embayment containing beds of sea-grass, mangroves, mudflats, rock platforms and beaches. The coastal wetland habitats are backed by hills and ridges vegetated with savanna woodland dominated by Eucalyptus alba, with patches of tropical dry forest.

Birds
The site has been identified by BirdLife International as an IBA because it supports visiting, though non-breeding, critically endangered Christmas Island frigatebirds, as well as populations of pink-headed imperial pigeons, streak-breasted honeyeaters, Timor friarbirds, plain gerygones, fawn-breasted whistlers, olive-brown orioles, blue-cheeked flowerpeckers, flame-breasted sunbirds and Timor sparrows.

See also
 List of Important Bird Areas in East Timor

References

Beaches of East Timor
Important Bird Areas of East Timor
Dili Municipality